PB&J Television, also known as PB&J TV, is a television production company based in Santa Monica, California, USA.

History
PB&J was started in 2004 by Julie Pizzi and Patty Ivins. Ivins has been working in reality television and news/documentary since 1996, and Pizzi since 1998. PB&J Television has executive produced NBC’s Sports Illustrated: Swimsuit Model Search, L.A. Riding Club for TLC, Showtime’s Reversal of Fortune, Style’s The Modern Girl’s Guide to Life, and CMT’s Pageant School: Becoming Miss America.

Prior to forming PB&J, Ivins was the supervising producer of the hit TV series The Simple Life, and Pizzi was a creative vice president at Bunim-Murray Productions for five years.  While at Bunim-Murry, Pizzi spearheaded development and executive produced several high-rated seasons of MTV's Road Rules, MTV's Real World/Road Rules Challenge and VH-1’s Born to Diva.  Ivins also spent time at Bunim-Murray Productions, where she produced and directed various shows including MTV’S Making the Band, MTV’S Road Rules and Fox’s Who Wants to Be a Playboy Playmate?  Together Ivins and Pizzi co-executive produced FOX's The Simple Life Reunion.

In addition to reality television, both Ivins and Pizzi have produced many hours of documentary programming for Showtime, A&E, AMC, TLC and Discovery.

Television productions
Miss America: Reality Check (2008)
America's Prom Queen (2008) 
Dress My Nest (2007)
Outrageous Proposals (2007)
Resolutionaries (2007)
Pageant School: Becoming Miss America (2006)
LA Riding Club (2006) 
Sports Illustrated Swimsuit Model Search (2005) 
Reversal of Fortune (2005)
Modern Girl's Guide to Life (2003)

References

External links
PB&J Television Web Site
PB&J Television at the Internet Movie Database

Mass media companies established in 2004
Television production companies of the United States